François-Xavier de Feller (18 August 1735 – 23 May 1802) was a Belgian author.

Biography
He was born in Brussels. In 1752 he entered a school of the Jesuits at Reims, where he manifested a great aptitude for mathematics and physical science. He commenced his novitiate two years afterwards, and in testimony of his admiration for the apostle of India added Xavier to his surname. On the expiry of his novitiate he became professor at Athénée de Luxembourg, and afterwards at Liège. In 1764 he was appointed to the professorship of theology at Tyrnau in Hungary, but in 1771 he returned to Belgium and continued to discharge his professorial duties at Liège till the suppression of the Jesuit Order in 1773.

The remainder of his life he devoted to study, travel and literature. On the invasion of Belgium by the French in 1794 he went to Paderborn, and remained there two years, after which he took up his residence at Ratisbon, where he died in 1802.

Feller's works exceed 120 volumes. In 1773 he published, under the assumed name Flexier de Reval (an anagram of "Xavier de Feller"), his Catéchisme philosophique; and his principal work Dictionnaire historique et littéraire (published in 1781 at Liège in volumes, and afterwards several times reprinted and continued down to 1848), appeared under the same name. Among his other works the most important are Cours de morale chrétienne et de littérature religieuse (Paris, 1826) and his Coup d'oeil sur le Congrès d'Ems (1787). The Journal historique et littéraire was published in Luxembourg from 1773 to 1788 and in Maastricht and Liège from 1788 to 1794; a total of 62 volumes appeared, edited and in large part written by Feller.

Works 

 Jugement d'un écrivain protestant touchant le Livre de Justinus Febronius, Leipzig, 1770 [Luxembourg ; sous le nom de Bar(d)t], ca. 56 p.
 Entretien de Voltaire et de M. P. P., docteur de Sorbonne, sur la nécessité de la religion chrétienne et catholique par rapport au salut, Liège, 1771, 8°, ca. 50 p.
 Lettre sur le Dîner du comte de Boulainvilliers, 1771, [s.l., s.d.] 20 p. 12°
 Observations philosophiques sur les systèmes de Newton, le mouvement de la terre et la pluralité des mondes etc. précédées d'une dissertation théologique sur les tremblements de la terre, les orages etc., Liège, 1771, 180 p., 12°
 Flexier de Reval, Catéchisme philosophique, Liège, 1773, VIII, 596 p., 8°
 Flexier de Reval, Examen critique de l'histoire naturelle de M. de Buffon, Héritiers Chevaliers Luxembourg, 1773, 48 p., 8°
 Journal historique et littéraire, Luxembourg, Liège, 1773 - 1794, Maestricht ; interdit par édit Joseph II du 26 janvier 1788
 Flexier de Reval, Discours sur divers sujets de religions et de morale, Héritiers Chevalier Luxembourg, 1777, 2 vol., 470 + 465 p., 8° [aussi dans Migne : ... orateurs sacrés LXV col. 9 à 344]
 Dictionnaire géographique-portatif etc., Paris, 1778, 2 vol., [16], 544 + 563 p.
 Examen impartial des époques de la nature de Mr. le Comte de Buffon, Héritiers Chevalier Luxembourg, 1780, 263 p., 8°
 Disquisitio philosophico-historico-theologica, etc., Héritiers Chevalier Luxembourg, 1780, 48 p., 8°
 Dictionnaire historique, Augsbourg, t. I (1781) XVI, 134, 574 p. + t. II (1782) 692 p. + t. III (1782) 747 p. + t. IV (1783) 678 p. + t V (1783) 768 p. + t VI (1784) 752 p., 8°
 Véritable état du différent élevé entre le Nonce apostolique de Cologne et les trois Electeurs ecclésiastiques, Düsseldorf [Cologne], 1787, 126 p.
 Supplément au véritable état du différent élevé entre le Nonce apostolique de Cologne et les trois Electeurs ecclésiastiques, 1787, 25 p., 8°
 Coup d'œil sur le Congrès d'Ems, précédé d'un second Supplément au Véritable État, Düsseldorf, 1787, 282 p. 8°
 Recueil des représentations, protestations et réclamations, 1787-1790, 17 vol.
 Supplément au recueil : Recueil des mémoires sur le commerce des Pays-Bas autrichiens, suivi d'un recueil complet des pièces relatives à la pêche nationale, [s.l.] 1787, 400 p., 8°
 Lettres concernant la prescription du Journal historique et littéraire, avec quelques notes de l'éditeur, 1788, [s.l.] 12 p., 8°
 Réflexions sur les 73 articles du Pro Memoria, présentés à la Diète d'Empire, touchant les nonciatures de la part de l'Archevéque-Electeur de Cologne. Ratisbona [Colonia], 1788, 240 p., 8°
 
 Défense des réflexions sur le Pro Memoria de Cologne, suivie de l'examen du Pro Memoria de Salzbourg, Ratisbona, 1789, 130 p., 8°
 Extrait d'une lettre de M.F.X.D.F. à M. le C.A. Tyrnau, 1790, 94 p., 8°
 Itinéraire, ou voyages M. l'abbé de Feller en diverses parties de l'Europe, Liegi e Parigi, 1820, 2 vol. 507 + 577 p., 8°

References

Further reading
Wahre Beschaffenheit des Zwistes, welcher sich zwischen dem apostolischen Nuntius zu Kölln und den drey geistlichen Churfürsten bey Gelegenheit eines Circularschreibens an die Pfarrer ihrer Diöcesen erhoben hat : Aus dem Französischen übersetzt. – S.l., 1788. digital copy by Universitäts- und Landesbibliothek Düsseldorf

External links
 

Belgian writers in French
Jesuits of the Austrian Netherlands
1735 births
1802 deaths